You Know You Want This: "Cat Person" and Other Stories is a collection of short stories by Kristen Roupenian.

Following the viral success of the short story Cat Person, Roupenian secured a seven figure deal with Scout Press for her debut book, and was the subject of a bidding war in the American market, with offers exceeding $1m.
She received a $1.2 million advance for the book.

References

2019 short story collections
English-language books
Gallery Books books